Noelle Barahona (born 30 November 1990 in Santiago) is an Olympic Chilean alpine skier. She is currently coached by Luciano Acerboni and skis for La Parva, a club in Santiago, Chile.

Biography 
Barahona was born in 1990 to two athletic parents—her mother Yasmin was a Chilean windsurfing champion, while her father Pablo competed in sailing in the 1984 Summer Olympics. 
She attended International School Nido de Aguilas from Pre-K to 12th Grade. Barahona is a student of Universidad Católica in Santiago de Chile. She speaks Spanish, English, and Italian.

Accomplishments 

 Ranked Number 1 skier in Chile.
 Competed in the 2006 Winter Olympic Games in Turin, Italy. At 15 years old, Barahona was the youngest alpine skier ever to compete.
 Competed in the  2010 Winter Olympics in Vancouver, Canada. In her best race, Barahona placed 10th.
 Appeared on the American TV show "Larry King Live" to speak about the Chilean earthquake on Feb. 27, 2010.
 Competed in the 2014 Winter Olympics taking place in Sochi, Russia.
 Competed in the 2018 Winter Olympics taking place in Pyeongchang County, Korea.

References

External links 
Vancouver 2010 bio

1990 births
Living people
Alpine skiers at the 2006 Winter Olympics
Alpine skiers at the 2010 Winter Olympics
Alpine skiers at the 2014 Winter Olympics
Alpine skiers at the 2018 Winter Olympics
Chilean female alpine skiers
Olympic alpine skiers of Chile
Sportspeople from Santiago